The Cus D'Amato Award, known alternatively as the Boxing Writers of America Manager of the Year Award and previously known as the Al Buck Award from 1967 to 2008, has been conferred annually since 1967 by the Boxing Writers Association of America on the manager, irrespective of nationality or class of fighter represented, adjudged by the membership of the Association to have been the best in boxing in a given year.

Named after Cus D'Amato, an American boxing manager, the award is presented with other honors given by the BWAA at an annual awards dinner held in the spring of the year following that for performance in which the award is given. The award was named till 2008 after Al Buck, an American sportswriter, long of The Ring.

List of winners

See also
Eddie Futch-John F.X. Condon Award, conferred by the BWAA on the trainer adjudged to be the best in boxing in a given year
The Ring annual awards

References

External links
List of award winners and winner biographies from boxrec.com
List of award winners from the official site of the Boxing Writers Association of America
List of BWAA awards from the official site of the International Boxing Hall of Fame

+
Boxing awards
Coaching awards
American sports trophies and awards
Awards established in 1967